The Taiwan Forestry Research Institute (TFRI) a research institute under the Council of Agriculture of the Taiwan (ROC) dealing with forest.

History

Empire of Japan
TRFI was originally established as a nursery on 6 January 1896 during the Japanese rule of Taiwan. In October 1900, a new plot of land was purchased at the present location of Taipei Botanical Garden and the nursery was named the Taipei Nursery. In 1911, on the foundation of Taipei Nursery, the Forestry Experimental Station was established to handle the management of forest in Taiwan. In 1921, the Japanese government unified all research institutes in Taiwan and established the Central Research Institute which included the Forestry Experimental Station but was named the Forestry Division of the Central Research Institute. In 1939, the Central Research Institute was reorganized and the Forestry Division was made independent named Forestry Research Institute.

Republic of China
After the handover of Taiwan from Japan to the Republic of China, it was later renamed to Taiwan Forestry Research Institute on 1 November 1945 and placed under the Taiwan Provincial Government. In September 1949, the research institute was transferred under the Agriculture and Forestry Administration. In July 1999, the research institute was formally renamed Taiwan Forestry Research Institute, Council of Agriculture (COA), Executive Yuan.

Organizational structures

Technical units
 Botanical Garden Division
 Forest Chemistry Division
 Forest Management Division
 Forest Protection Division
 Forestry Economics Division
 Forest Utilization Division
 Silviculture Division
 Technical Service Division
 Watershed Management Division
 Wood Cellulose Division

Administrative units
 Accounting and Statistics Office
 Ethics Morality Office
 Personnel Office
 Secretariat Office

Research centers
 Chungpu Research Center
 Fushan Research Center
 Hengchun Research Center
 Lienhuachih Research Center
 Lioukuei Research Center
 Taimalee Research Center

See also
 Geography of Taiwan

References

External links
 

Executive Yuan
1896 establishments in Taiwan
Forest research institutes
Forestry in Taiwan
Organizations established in 1896
Research institutes in Taiwan